Helena Hubertina Johanna "Lenny" Kuhr (born 22 February 1950) is a Dutch singer-songwriter.

Career

In 1967, she started a singing career in the Netherlands, performing songs in the French chanson tradition. In 1969, she represented the Netherlands in the Eurovision Song Contest with her composition "De troubadour" (lyrics by David Hartsema; orchestra conducted by Franz de Kok). She was one of the four winners that year.

In the early seventies, Kuhr was more successful in France than in her home country. In 1970 she toured with Georges Brassens. Late 1971 she had a top 10 hit in France with "Jesus Christo". 

In 1980, she had her biggest hit in the Netherlands: "Visite", a song she performed with the French group Les Poppys. She has been releasing records ever since, though without major chart success.

Lenny Kuhr was one of the artists who recorded the song "Shalom from Holland" (written by Simon Hammelburg and Ron Klipstein) as a token of solidarity to the Israeli people, threatened by missiles from Iraq, during the Gulf War in 1991.

Lenny Kuhr performed "De troubadour" during the interval of the Grand Final of the Eurovision Song Contest on Saturday 22 May 2021 in Rotterdam, in a segment called "Rock the Roof", together with other Eurovision winners.

Personal life
Kuhr's first marriage was in 1974 to an Israeli doctor, whom she met after she had her nose damaged in an attack in May 1973, in Haarlem. Her new husband repaired her nose and Kuhr converted to Judaism. She had two daughters with her first husband, one in 1975 and the second in 1980. She also lived in Israel for a while.

After her divorce, Kuhr was romantically involved with songwriter Herman Pieter de Boer, from 1981 to 1993.

She was married for a second time in 2003.

Discography
1969: Lenny Kuhr
1971: De zomer achterna
1972: Tout ce que j'aime / Les enfants
1972: De wereld waar ik van droom
1974: God laat ons vrij
1976: 'n Dag als vandaag
1980: Dromentrein
1981: Avonturen
1982: Oog in oog
1983: De beste van Lenny Kuhr (compilation album)
1986: Quo vadis
1988: Lenny Kuhr (compilation album)
1990: Het beste van Lenny Kuhr (compilation album)
1990: De blauwe nacht
1992: Heilig vuur
1994: Altijd heimwee
1997: Gebroken stenen (also released in German as Gebrochene Steine)
1997: Stemmen in de nacht
1999: Oeverloze liefde
2000: Visite (compilation album)
2001: Hollands glorie (compilation album)
2001: Fadista
2004: Op de grens van jou en mij
2005: Panta Rhei
2007: 40 Jaar verliefd (live album)
2010: Hollands glorie (compilation album)
2010: Mijn liedjes mijn leven (CD/DVD boxset)
2011: Liefdeslied
2013: Wie ben je
2017: Gekust door de eeuwigheid
2019: Het lied gaat door
2021: Favorieten Expres (compilation album)
2022: Lenny Kuhr

References

External links

 

1950 births
Living people
Converts to Judaism
Eurovision Song Contest entrants for the Netherlands
Dutch expatriates in Israel
Dutch women singers
Dutch Jews
Dutch singer-songwriters
Eurovision Song Contest entrants of 1969
Eurovision Song Contest winners
Jewish Dutch musicians
Musicians from Eindhoven
Philips Records artists
Nationaal Songfestival contestants
Nationaal Songfestival presenters